Dual county is a term used in Gaelic games to describe a county that competes at a similar level in both hurling and Gaelic football. For example, Dublin play in Division 1 in both the NHL and NFL, while Laois compete in the second tier of the football competition and the first tier of the hurling competition.

Among the dual counties generally recognised are:
Carlow
Cork
Dublin
Galway
Laois
Offaly
Westmeath

Only Tipperary and Cork have won both premier men's competitions, the All-Ireland Senior Hurling and All-Ireland Senior Football championships in the same year. Tipperary won both in 1895 and 1900, while Cork won both in 1890 and 1990. Tipperary would today be regarded as primarily a hurling county, having not won a major senior football title since 1935 but won the All-Ireland Minor Football Championship in 2011 and the Munster Senior Football Championship in 2020.

Dublin have made improvements in hurling since the turn of the millennium, winning the 2011 National Hurling League and the 2013 Leinster Senior Hurling Championship, and are now considered to be a dual county.

Other counties that feature in the lower tiers of Hurling and Football Divisions could also be classified as Dual Counties. Westmeath and Carlow would be considered as having strong hurling bases, along with pockets in Down.

Derry is a small dual county. Counties such as Wicklow, Sligo, Leitrim, Meath and Kildare have a steady and growing hurling population. These, and counties such as Derry, are outperforming their footballing counterparts in both their respective League and Championship competitions. 
 
Dual player is a similar phrase used to describe players who play both sports.

References

Gaelic games terminology